Kunzler & Company, Inc. (often referred to as Kunzler) is an American food manufacturer and processor.

The company was founded in 1901 by a German butcher named Christian Kunzler who moved to Lancaster, Pennsylvania.  Headquarters are still based in the city of Lancaster and produces such products as natural hardwood smoked bacon, ham, bologna smoked with native Pennsylvania hardwoods, beef and grill franks, Pennsylvania Dutch scrapple, and Midwestern, hand-trimmed steak.

Kunzler & Company, Inc. produces the official hot dog of the Lancaster Barnstormers baseball team.
Kunzler & Company is in its 4th generation of family operating the business.

External links
Official website

Companies based in Lancaster, Pennsylvania
Brand name meats
Brand name hot dogs
Sausage companies of the United States
Ham producers